The following is a list of radio stations in the Canadian territory of Yukon, .

See also 
 Lists of radio stations in North and Central America

External links
 Canadian Communications Foundation - History of Radio stations in the Yukon Territory

Yukon
Radio stations